The Church of Jesus Christ of Latter-day Saints and the Kingdom of God is a Mormon fundamentalist church in the Latter Day Saint movement. The sect was founded by Frank Naylor and Ivan Nielsen, who split from the Centennial Park group, another fundamentalist church. The church is estimated to have 200–300 members, most of whom reside in the Salt Lake Valley. The group is also known as the Third Ward or the Naylor group, after Frank Naylor.

Polygamist roots
The Church of Jesus Christ of Latter-day Saints and the Kingdom of God's claims of authority are based around the accounts of John Wickersham Woolley, Lorin Calvin Woolley and others, of a meeting in September 1886 between LDS Church President John Taylor, the Woolleys, and others. Prior to the meeting, Taylor is said to have met with Jesus Christ and the deceased church founder, Joseph Smith, and to have received a revelation commanding that plural marriage should not cease, but be kept alive by a group separate from the LDS Church. The following day, the Woolleys, as well as Taylor's counselor, George Q. Cannon, and others, were said to have been set apart to keep "the principle" alive.

Split from the Centennial Park group
The Centennial Park group is a polygamist sect based in the Arizona Strip. This group is itself a split from the Fundamentalist Church of Jesus Christ of Latter-Day Saints (FLDS Church). The Centennial Park group refers to itself as the "Second Ward" and refers to the FLDS Church as the "First Ward". When Alma A. Timpson became leader of the Second Ward in 1988, he appointed Frank Naylor as apostle and Ivan Nielsen as high priest and later as bishop. Naylor and Nielsen disagreed with Timpson's leadership and they split from the Second Ward in 1990 to form the "Third Ward" with Naylor as leader.

The new church
Naylor and Nielsen were able to gather a number of followers from both the Centennial Park group and the FLDS Church. Most of the members of the new group migrated north to the Salt Lake Valley in Utah where they have built a meeting house. They continue to practice polygamy as well as other fundamentalist doctrines such as the Adam–God doctrine. The church has also formed a close relationship with the Church of Jesus Christ (Original Doctrine) Inc., an FLDS Church-offshoot based in Bountiful, British Columbia.

See also
 Factional breakdown: Mormon fundamentalist sects
List of fundamentalist sects in the Latter Day Saint movement
Big Love HBO series about a fictional independent polygamous Mormon fundamentalist family

References

Further reading
Hales, Brian C. (2007). Modern Polygamy and Mormon Fundamentalism: The Generations After the Manifesto(Salt Lake City, Utah: Greg Kofford Books).
Quinn, D. Michael "Plural Marriage and Mormon Fundamentalism", Dialogue: A Journal of Mormon Thought 31(2) (Summer 1998).
"The Primer" - Helping Victims of Domestic Violence and Child Abuse in Polygamous Communities. A joint report from the offices of the Attorneys General of Arizona and Utah.
Van Wagoner, Richard S. (1999). Mormon Polygamy: A History. UK: Prometheus Books. .

Mormon fundamentalist denominations
Latter Day Saint movement in Utah
Salt Lake County, Utah
Organizations based in Utah
Christian organizations established in 1990